The 1910 Isle of Man Tourist Trophy races took place on the Short Course (St John's, Ballacraine, Kirk Michael, Peel, St John's).

500cc Single & 670cc Twin Results Open Class final standings 
Thursday 26 May 1910 – 10 laps (158 ⅛ miles) St John's Short Course.

Sources

External links 
 Detailed race results
 Mountain Course map

1910
1910 in British motorsport
1910 in motorsport